Zornotza Saskibaloi Taldea, also known as Ametx Zornotza for sponsorship reasons, is a basketball team based in Amorebieta-Etxano, Spain.

History
After several seasons in Primera División, the club rose to Liga EBA thanks to the expansion of the group A of the league. After three seasons in the fourth tier, the club surprisingly promoted to LEB Plata, where it played until 2017. In its last season, Zornotza reached the final of the promotion playoffs to LEB Oro, but was finally eliminated by Comercial Ulsa Ciudad de Valladolid.

On 18 July 2017, the club announced it could not fulfill the requirements in the league and it will appeal against the decision of FEB.

Season by season

References

External links
Official website

Former LEB Plata teams
Basque basketball teams
Former Liga EBA teams
Basketball teams established in 1959
1959 establishments in Spain
Sport in Biscay